= Howard Hawks bibliography =

A list of books and essays about Howard Hawks:

- Hawks, Howard (2006). Howard Hawks: Interviews. Univ. Press of Mississippi. ISBN 978-1-57806-833-3.
- Hillier, Jim; Institute, British Film (1996). Howard Hawks, American artist. BFI Publishing. ISBN 978-0-85170-593-4.
- McCarthy, Todd (2000). Howard Hawks: The Grey Fox of Hollywood. Grove Press. ISBN 978-0-8021-3740-1.
- Poague, Leland A. (1982). Howard Hawks. Gale. ISBN 978-0-8057-9285-0.
- Wood, Robin (January 2006). Howard Hawks. Wayne State University Press. ISBN 0-8143-3276-5.
